Alexey Soloviev (born 14 September 1973) is a Russian professional boxer who once held the IBF International heavyweight title.

Alexey Soloviev was born on the fourteenth of September, 1973 in Cheboksary, Russia. He made his professional boxing debut on the twenty ninth of April, 2004 by beating Pavel Kalabin in a sixth round unanimous decision. In 2006, Soloviev won the vacant CISBB heavyweight title from Oleg Belikov. He never defended the title. In 2007, Soloviev stopped Talgat Dosanov in the eleventh round to win the IBF International. He defended it in the following year by knocking out Raymond Ochieng in the third round. Alexey retired after defeating Ibrahim Labaran in just two rounds. He had an undefeated record of 18 fights, 18 victories, and 12 by way of knockout.

Professional boxing record

References

Russian male boxers
Super-heavyweight boxers
1973 births
Living people